The Stade Charles Tondreau is a multi-purpose stadium in Mons, Belgium.  It is currently used mostly for football matches and is the home ground of R.A.E.C. Mons.  The stadium holds 8,000.

Multi-purpose stadiums in Belgium
Football venues in Wallonia
Sports venues in Hainaut (province)
Sport in Mons
R.A.E.C. Mons